Ontake may refer to:
 Mount Ontake, the second-highest volcano in Japan, located on Honshu
 2330 Ontake, a main-belt asteroid named after the volcano